This is a list of notable European companies. For further information on the types of business entities in this union and their abbreviations, see "Business entities in the European Union".

By Revenue
The following is a list of 26 largest European Union companies 2015, ordered by revenue in millions of US dollars.

By Member State

European Union-related lists
Union